František Blažek (1863 in Zálší – 1 January 1944 in Prague) was a Czech architect who designed a great number of buildings in Bosnia and Herzegovina during the Austro-Hungarian period.

Work
In Bosnia and Herzegovina he is also known as Franz Blazek, Franz Blažek, or Frank Blazek.

František Blažek also designed three hotels in Sarajevo's suburb of Ilidža near the Vrelo Bosne: hotels Igman, Austria and Bosna. They were completed in 1895.

Gallery

See also

 Karel Pařík
 Josip Vancaš
 Alexander Wittek
 Juraj Neidhardt
 Architecture of Mostar

References

External links
 

1863 births
1944 deaths
People from Ústí nad Orlicí District
Czech architects
Bosnia and Herzegovina architects